Revenge is a 1928 American silent drama film directed by Edwin Carewe and starring Dolores del Río, James A. Marcus, LeRoy Mason, and Rita Carewe. The film was inspired by the novel The Daughter of the Bear Tamer by Konrad Bercovici. The film had a synchronized music score and sound effects. No copies of Revenge are known to exist in film archives.

Cast
in billing order:

Dolores del Río as Rascha
James A. Marcus as Costa
Sophia Ortiga as Binka
LeRoy Mason as Jorga
Rita Carewe as Tina
José Crespo as Stefan
Sam Appel as Jancu
Marta Golden as Leana
Jess Cavin as Lieutenant De Jorga

Production
Dolores del Río had the luxury of renaming the film adaptation as Revenge, as she believed that all of her film successes began with the letter "R" (Resurrection (1927), Ramona (1928), and The Red Dance (1928)). While del Rio was in the middle of divorcing Jaime Martínez del Río in 1926, Revenge was abandoned. She eventually divorced him in 1928. Production resumed on Revenge in June 1928 and was finished filming by August 1928.

Film score
Hugo Riesenfeld composed the music for Revenge.

Cinematography
Revenges cinematographers were Al Green and Robert Kurrle.

Editing
Editing of Revenge was done by Jeanne Spencer.

Reception

Release
Revenge was released on November 3, 1928, in United States film theatres.

References

Citations

Sources

External links

Stills at silenthollywood.com
Still at gettyimages.com

1928 films
American silent feature films
United Artists films
American romantic drama films
American black-and-white films
Lost American films
1928 romantic drama films
Films directed by Edwin Carewe
1920s English-language films
1920s American films
Silent romantic drama films
Silent American drama films